Forbidden to the Public (French: Interdit au public) is a 1949 French comedy film directed by Alfred Pasquali and starring Jacques Erwin, Mary Marquet and Jacqueline Gauthier.

Cast
 Jacques Erwin as Hervé Montagne
 Mary Marquet as Gabrielle Tristan
 José Noguero as Pepito Pajo
 Michel Roux as Pierre
 Jacqueline Gauthier as Gisèle
 Mona Goya as Nicole
 Alfred Pasquali as Saturnin
 Serge Nadaud as Korninoff
 Jeanne Longuet as the secretary
 Hubert Noël as Bernard
 Maxime Fabert as Robert
 Camille Fournier as Lucienne
 Jean Marsan as the actor
 Monique Gérard as an actress
 Tania Soucault as an actress
 Christiane Auger as an actress
 Simone Duhart as an actress

References

Bibliography 
 Rège, Philippe. Encyclopedia of French Film Directors, Volume 1. Scarecrow Press, 2009.

External links 
 

1949 films
French comedy films
1949 comedy films
1940s French-language films
Films directed by Alfred Pasquali
French black-and-white films
1940s French films